Bechala is a genus of insects in the extinct order Megasecoptera. It existed during the late Carboniferous in what is now Germany. It was described by Jan-Michael Ilger and Carsten Brauckmann in 2012, and the type species is B. sommeri. Its type specimen was a wing (AKH 524) discovered at the Küchenberg quarry, in the Ziegelschiefer Formation. The wing measurements are 39x6 millimetres.

References

External links
 Bechala at the Paleobiology Database

Pennsylvanian insects
Permian insects
Fossil taxa described in 2012
Fossils of Germany